Pray for Paris is the third studio album by American rapper Westside Gunn. It was released on April 17, 2020 through Griselda Records with distribution by Empire Distribution. The album was produced by Daringer, Beat Butcha, the Alchemist, DJ Muggs, and DJ Premier. It features guest appearances from Benny the Butcher, Conway the Machine, Joey Badass, Tyler, the Creator, Boldy James, Freddie Gibbs, Roc Marciano, Wale, Joyce Wrice, Billie Essco, Keisha Plum, and Cartier Williams. The album debuted at number 67 on the Billboard 200.

Background and development
Westside Gunn announced he was recording a project called Pray for Paris after having attended Virgil Abloh's Off-White Paris fashion show on January 18, 2020. He revealed the album's artwork on April 3, 2020. The cover was created by Virgil Abloh using Caravaggio's David with the Head of Goliath. During the album's recording Westside learned he had contracted COVID-19 and recounted having to do promotion for the album while suffering symptoms from the virus. Before the album's release, Westside Gunn and Virgil Abloh live-streamed the entire project on Twitch.

Critical reception

Pray for Paris received critical acclaim from critics. At Album of the Year, which assigns a normalized rating out of 100 to reviews from mainstream critics, the album received an average score of 77 based on six reviews.

Gregory Castel of Earmilk stated "Pray for Paris is a soulful yet, grimey masterpiece. This album is a handpicked selection of high-level artists, in lyricism, soulful production, and visual artwork". Riley Wallace of HipHopDX said, "Pray For Paris seems to show Gunn resisting being boxed-in artistically. For some critics who may have found past offerings more of an acquired taste, this is the camp’s most inviting project to date". Alphonse Pierre of Pitchfork stated "The Buffalo rapper continues his unlikely ascent into hip-hop stardom with an album of feverish excess and the best raps of his career". In his Substack-published "Consumer Guide" column, Robert Christgau said that "this album enjoys old-fashioned hip-hop materialism with dauntless esprit". Exclaim! reviewer A. Harmony said "Though Gunn's vintage sound might not work for everyone, Pray for Paris is a total delight for those who want to reminisce without feeling stuck in the past".

In another positive review, Dylan Green of DJ Booth stated "In the age of streaming and playlists, Pray For Paris further solidifies Westside Gunn as an album artist. He knows how to craft experiences from start to finish, what beats sound best next to each other, which features will yield the wildest results".  Ryan Middleton of Magnetic Magazine said, "Despite this album having the sheen of opulence and examining fuck you money at the outset, it remains grounded with an ear to the streets."

Accolades

Track listing

Charts

References

External links

2020 albums
Albums produced by DJ Muggs
Albums produced by DJ Premier
Albums produced by Beat Butcha
Albums produced by Tyler, the Creator
Albums produced by Daringer (producer)
Albums produced by the Alchemist (musician)
Griselda Records albums